Our Lady of Purification Church also known as the Port Kollam Church is a historic Roman Catholic church near Kollam Port in Kollam district of Kerala. According to ecclesiastical tradition the church was established by Thomas the Apostle  in 52 CE along with six other churches in Kerala and these churches together are called Ēḻarappaḷḷikaḷ. The church follows Latin Rite and is in the Roman Catholic Diocese of Quilon.

History
Tradition holds that in AD 52, Thomas the Apostle travelled to Kerala's coast. For people who were baptized by Saint Thomas to worship, a church was built in Kollam between CE 52 and 78. However, Violent sea erosion destroyed this church. The believers built a second church for worship with the King of Kollam's approval, but it was also destroyed by sea erosion. The ruins of the second church are still visible in the sea during low tides. The name "Pallikallu" given to it by the local fishermen literally translates as "the stone of the great church". A group of local divers retrieved a rock from the submerged church ruins in February 2021, and it was then installed in the church as a symbol of the community's unwavering faith.

The Pope John XXII designated Kollam (Quilon) as the first diocese in India in 1329 and there was a church called Kollam church before the arrival of the Portuguese in the sixteenth century. Later, the Portuguese constructed a number of additional churches in the area, leading to the renaming of Kollam Church as "Port Kollam Church". The Port Kollam parish was also blessed by the visit of Francis Xavier as part of his missionary activities along the Malabar coast. A new church, constructed in 1912 and dedicated to Our Lady of Purification, stood for more than 70 years, and at the end of the 20th century, a reconstruction plan was started to build the church present today. The foundation stone for the reconstruction was blessed by His Holiness Pope John Paul II in Thiruvananthapuram on the 8th of February 1986 during his Apostolic Pilgrimage to India. The church was finally blessed on 23 January 1993 by the Bishop of Kollam, Rt. Rev. Dr. Joseph G. Fernandez.

Liturgy Timings

Annual Events
Along with other universal festivities of Christendom, three great feasts are revered and fervently observed in the church each year by the faithful.

Feast of Our Lady of Purification

Thousands of followers of all faiths and religions flock to the feast of Our Lady of Purification, which is celebrated annually from January 23 to February 2. The legend behind this celebration is that, in accordance with the Old Testament, a mother would bring her son to the Temple 40 days after his birth in order to present herself for purification and to present the child to God (Leviticus 12). When Jesus was a newborn, Joseph and Mary took him to the Jerusalem Temple where they offered Him to God as an offering (Luke 2:22–40). So, every year a feast is held to remember this occasion. As a result, the Holy Mother in this occasion is also known as Kanikka Mathavu.
The Church will be illuminated and decorated with vibrant lights beginning with a ceremony to hoist the flag on January 23 to announce the start of the festival. During the festive days, religious discourses such as Bible conventions and special prayers will be held. On February 1, there will be a large procession that will cover most of Port Kollam, and people will decorate the streets with Mother Mary statues in a lovely backdrop that has been enhanced with candles, lights, and flowers. A special ritual takes place on the feast day (February 2). Women with their newly born babies (below 2 years) come to the church and submit them before Saint Mary as an offering.

Feast of Saint Thomas
Tradition holds that on July 3, AD 72, at Chennai's St. Thomas Mount, Thomas the Apostle was speared to death.Every year on July 3rd, the Port Kollam Church commemorates this martyrdom by celebrating Saint Thomas the Apostle's pilgrimage feast. On the eve of the feast day, there is a procession carrying the relic of Thomas the Apostle covering places beyond the ecclesiastical jurisdiction of the Port Kollam parish. On the feast day, a jubilant holy mass is conducted, and most commonly, the mass will be a pontifical mass led by a bishop. The rededication of the relic on the altar and the subsequent lowering of the raised flag mark the conclusion of the feast.

Feast of Assumption of Mary
The feast of the assumption is fervently observed in the Port Kollam church on August 15 each year. The celebration of Assumption Day commemorates the doctrine that Mary, the mother of Jesus Christ, was believed to have had both her body and soul taken up into heavenly glory at death. Flag hoisting, special liturgies, and a prayerful procession are all part of the Assumption celebrations. It's interesting that India's independence day and the feast of assumption both fall on the same day. The Flag of India's colours will be used to usually decorate the altar with flowers.

Relics
Thomas the Apostle's remains were sent to a number of locations after his death, but the majority of them were eventually interred in the Basilica di San Tommaso in Ortona, Italy.In 1958, Jerome M. Fernandez, the then Bishop of Kollam, brought the relics of Thomas the Apostle from Ortona, Italy, and placed them in the Bishops' House of Quilon Diocese. On June 30th, 2006, this relic was taken from the bishop's house and, after a devout reception from various parishes along the coastal region, it was finally enshrined in the altar of the Port Kollam church.The altar of the Port Kollam church also holds a relic of Saint Mother Teresa.

Shrines
Within the church's premises, there are two shrines. The oldest shrine is dedicated to Friday devotion to 'Ecce Homo' (Kaiketty Easho). This shrine's statue was delivered to this parish in 1806. On Fridays, a large number of people gather to pray for all of their intentions. Devotees have shared testimonials of the miracles they have experienced through Kaiketty Easho. The new shrine dedicated to Saint Thomas was consecrated in 2006 by the then kollam bishop, Rt. Rev. Dr. Stanley Roman.

Gallery

References

Churches in Kollam district